Danny Jones (6 March 1986 – 3 May 2015) was a Wales international rugby league footballer who played in the 2000s and 2010s.

Background
Jones was born in Halifax, West Yorkshire, England.

Playing career
Jones played for Halifax amateur teams, Ovenden and King Cross before turning professional and signing for Halifax. He made his first team début aged 17 years and 200 days in what was to be his only Super League appearance, Halifax's last game of Super League VIII in 2003. He remained with Halifax until 2006 when he joined Keighley Cougars for the start of the 2007 season.  After four seasons with Keighley, he returned to Halifax for the 2011 season but then moved back to Keighley in 2012.

International honours
Jones was a Wales international, having made his début in a defeat by Italy in 2010. He was named in the Wales squad for the 2013 Rugby League World Cup.

Death
During a League 1 match between Keighley Cougars and London Skolars on 3 May 2015, Jones was substituted in the fourth minute of the game after reporting feeling unwell.  Soon after he went into cardiac arrest, he received treatment at the scene by the match doctor and was transferred by air ambulance to the Royal Free Hospital where he subsequently died. The match was abandoned after the incident. A post-mortem revealed that the cardiac arrest was caused by a previous undetected, hereditary, heart disease.

Keighley announced on 4 May that the number 6 shirt number worn by Jones during the 2015 season would be retired with immediate effect. The main stand at Cougar Park was named The Danny Jones Stand at the end of May.

Jones' widow, Lizzie, performed the traditional Challenge Cup Final hymn, Abide With Me before the 2015 Challenge Cup Final, to say "thank you to players, fans and officials for their support since her husband's death" .
Lizzie also sang Danny Boy at the BBC Sports personality of the Year awards on 20 December 2015.

Legacy
In February 2016, Lizzie worked with the RFL Benevolent Fund to establish the Danny Jones Defibrillator Fund to raise awareness of cardiac health among sports players and to help clubs purchase defibrillators as well as pushing for all players to undergo heart screening.  By 2019 the fund had raised and distributed over £200,000 in grants to amateur clubs.

References

External links

Video "Danny Jones Scores in every 2009 match. Only UK player to achieve this" at youtube.com

1986 births
2015 deaths
English people of Welsh descent
English rugby league players
Halifax R.L.F.C. players
Keighley Cougars players
Rugby league halfbacks
Sport deaths in England
Rugby league players from Halifax, West Yorkshire
Wales national rugby league team players